Ummendorf is a municipality in the Börde district in Saxony-Anhalt, Germany.

References

Börde (district)